The following is a list of episodes of the UPN/The CW sitcom Everybody Hates Chris. Each season contains 22 episodes. A total of 88 episodes were produced over the course of 4 seasons airing from September 22, 2005 to May 8, 2009.

All episode titles begin with the phrase "Everybody Hates..."

Series overview
{| class="wikitable plainrowheaders" style="text-align:center;"
|-
! colspan="2" rowspan="2" |Season
! rowspan="2" |Episodes
! colspan="2" |Originally aired
|-
! First aired
! Last aired
|-
| style="background: #eecd9a;"|
| [[List of Everybody Hates Chris episodes#Season 1 (2005–06)|1]]
| 22
| September 22, 2005
| May 11, 2006
|-
| style="background: #00b7eb;"|
| [[List of Everybody Hates Chris episodes#Season 2 (2006–07)|2]]
| 22
| October 1, 2006
| May 14, 2007
|-
| style="background: #AC2123;"|
| [[List of Everybody Hates Chris episodes#Season 3 (2007–08)|3]]
| 22
| October 1, 2007
| May 18, 2008
|-
| style="background: #87cdb5;"|
| [[List of Everybody Hates Chris episodes#Season 4 (2008–09)|4]]
| 22
| October 3, 2008
| May 8, 2009
|}

Episodes

Season 1 (2005–2006)

Season 2 (2006–2007)

Season 3 (2007-2008)

Season 4 (2008-2009)

References

Everybody Hates Chris
Lists of American sitcom episodes

fr:Saison 1 de Tout le monde déteste Chris
it:Episodi di Tutti odiano Chris (prima stagione)